Igor Remetić (born 14 September 1976) is a Bosnian professional football manager and former player. Owner since 2021 UEFA PRO coach license.

Playing career
Remetić started his playing career at locl side Velež Mostar, but as the Yugoslav Wars started, he became a refugee in Serbia where he continued his career initially playing with lower-league side FK Radnički Jaša Tomić. Remetić then continued climbing up his career in the Serbian league system, first playing with Vrbas, and then a longer spell between 1998 and 2003 with third-level AIK Bačka Topola.

In the season 2003–04, he moved to Sweden and played with Östers, following a return to the Balkans next season, this time to play with Croatian side GOŠK Dubrovnik between 2004 and 2006. The following season, Remetić returned to Bosnia and Herzegovina and joined Velež Mostar, playing with them in the 2006–07 season. It was then followed by a spell with another Bosnian side, Čapljina between 2008 and 2010. His last season as a player was spent by playing the first part of the 2010–11 season with Rudar Kakanj, before ending his career by playing the rest of the season with Velež Mostar.

Managerial statistics

Honours

Player
GOŠK Dubrovnik
3. HNL: 2005–06 (South)

Čapljina
Second League of FBiH: 2009–10 (South)

Manager
TOŠK Tešanj
Second League of FBiH: 2016–17 (Center)

References

External links
Igor Remetić at Betstudy.com

1976 births
Living people
Sportspeople from Mostar
Association football forwards
Bosnia and Herzegovina footballers
FK Vrbas players
FK TSC Bačka Topola players
Östers IF players
NK GOŠK Dubrovnik players
FK Velež Mostar players
HNK Čapljina players
FK Rudar Kakanj players
Superettan players
First Football League (Croatia) players
Premier League of Bosnia and Herzegovina players
First League of the Federation of Bosnia and Herzegovina players
Bosnia and Herzegovina expatriate footballers
Expatriate footballers in Serbia and Montenegro
Bosnia and Herzegovina expatriate sportspeople in Serbia and Montenegro
Expatriate footballers in Sweden
Bosnia and Herzegovina expatriate sportspeople in Sweden
Expatriate footballers in Croatia
Bosnia and Herzegovina expatriate sportspeople in Croatia
Bosnia and Herzegovina football managers
NK TOŠK Tešanj managers
NK Travnik managers
Bosnia and Herzegovina expatriate football managers
Expatriate football managers in Croatia